The 2009–10 Eastern Kentucky Colonels basketball team represented Eastern Kentucky University in the 2009–10 NCAA Division I men's basketball season. The Colonels were led by head coach Jeff Neubauer in his fifth year leading the team. Eastern Kentucky played their home games at McBrayer Arena in Richmond, Kentucky, as members of the Ohio Valley Conference. 

The Colonels finished conference play with an 11–7 record, earning the fifth seed in the Ohio Valley tournament.

Eastern Kentucky failed to qualify for the NCAA tournament, but were invited to the 2010 College Basketball Invitational. The Colonels were eliminated by College of Charleston, 82–79.

The Colonels finished the season with a 20–13 record.

Roster 

Source

Schedule and results

|-
!colspan=9 style=|Regular season

|-
!colspan=9 style=| Ohio Valley tournament

|-
!colspan=9 style=| CBI

References

Eastern Kentucky Colonels men's basketball seasons
Eastern Kentucky
Eastern Kentucky
Eastern Kentucky men's basketball
Eastern Kentucky men's basketball